Pyrzany  is a village in the administrative district of Gmina Witnica, within Gorzów County, Lubusz Voivodeship, in western Poland.

Notable residents
 Helmut Lent (1918–1944), fighter ace from Germany

References

Pyrzany